Moivo is an administrative ward in the Arumeru district of the Arusha Region of Tanzania. According to the 2002 census, the ward has a total population of 20,562. The ward is the second most populous ward in the district after Sokon II.

References

Wards of Arusha District
Wards of Arusha Region